The Spanish Fighting Bull (Toro Bravo, toro de lidia, toro lidiado, ganado bravo, Touro de Lide) is an Iberian heterogeneous cattle population. It is exclusively bred free-range on extensive estates in Spain, Portugal, France and Latin American countries where bull fighting is organized. Fighting bulls are selected primarily for a certain combination of aggression, energy, strength and stamina. In order to preserve their natural traits, during breeding the bulls rarely encounter humans, and if so, never encounter them on foot.

History of the breed 

Some commentators trace the origins of the fighting bull to wild bulls from the Iberian Peninsula and their use for arena games in the Roman Empire.
Although the actual origins are disputed, genetic studies have indicated that the breeding stock have an unusually old genetic pool.

The aggression of the bull has been maintained (or augmented, see above) by selective breeding and has come to be popular among the people of Spain and Portugal and the parts of Latin America where it took root during colonial rule, as well as parts of Southern France, where bullfighting spread during the 19th century.

In May 2010, Spanish scientists cloned the breed for the first time. The calf, named Got, meaning "glass" in Valencian, was cloned from a bull named Vasito and implanted in a Friesian surrogate cow.

Breed characteristics 

Fighting bulls are characterized by their aggressive behavior, especially when solitary or unable to flee. Many are colored black or dark brown, but other colorations are normal. They reach maturity slower than meat breeds as they were not selected to be heavy, having instead a well-muscled "athletic" look, with a prominent morrillo, a complex of muscles over the shoulder and neck which gives the bull its distinctive profile and strength with its horns. The horns are longer than in most other breeds and are present in both males and females.

Among fighting cattle there are several "encastes" or subtypes of the breed. Of the so-called "foundational breeds," only the bloodlines of Vistahermosa, Vázquez, Gallardo and Cabrera remain today. In the cases of the latter two only the ranches of Miura and Pablo Romero are deeply influenced by them. The so-called "modern foundational bloodlines" are Saltillo, Murube, Parladé and Santa Coloma, all of which are primarily composed of Vistahermosa blood.

Cattle have dichromatic vision, rendering them red-green colorblind and falsifying the idea that the color red makes them angry; they just respond to the movements of the muleta. The red coloring is traditional and is believed to both conceal blood stains and provide a suitable light-dark contrast against the arena floor.

Growth 

Fighting cattle are bred on wide-ranging ranches in Spain's dehesas or in the portuguese Montados, which are often havens for Iberian wildlife as the farming techniques used are extensive. Both male and female calves spend their first year of life with their mothers; then they are weaned, branded, and kept in single-sex groups. When the cattle reach maturity after two years or so, they are sent to the tienta, or testing.

For the males, this establishes if they are suitable for breeding, the bullfight, or slaughter for meat. The testing for the bullfight is only of their aggression towards the horse, as regulations forbid their charging a man on the ground before they enter the bullfighting ring. They learn how to use their horns in tests of strength and dominance with other bulls. Due to their special aggression, these combats can lead to severe injuries and even death of the bulls, at great cost to their breeders.

The females are more thoroughly tested, including by a bullfighter with his capes; hence a bull's "courage" is often said to descend from his mother.

If fit for bullfighting, bulls will return to their peers. Cows passing the tienta are kept for breeding and will be slaughtered only when they can bear no more calves.

At three years old males are no longer considered calves; they are known as novillos and are ready for bullfighting, although novilladas are for training bullfighters, or novilleros. The best bulls are kept for corridas de toros with full matadors. Under Spanish law they must be at least four years old and reach the weight of 460 kg to fight in a first-rank bullring, 435 kg for a second-rank one, and 410 kg for third-rank rings. They must also have fully functional vision and even horns (which have not been tampered with) and be in generally good condition.

A very few times each year a bull will be indultado, or "pardoned," meaning his life is spared due to outstanding behavior in the bullring, leading the audience to petition the president of the ring with white handkerchiefs. The bullfighter joins the petition, as it is a great honor to have a bull one has fought pardoned. The president pardons the bull showing an orange handkerchief. The bull, if he survives his injuries, which are usually severe, is then returned to the ranch he was bred at, where he will live out his days in the fields. In most cases, he will become a "seed bull", mated once with some 30 cows. Four years later, his offspring will be tested in the ring. If they fight well, he may be bred again.
An "indultado" bull's lifespan can be 20 to 25 years.

Miura

The ranch is known for producing large and difficult fighting bulls. A Miura bull debuted in Madrid on April 30, 1849. The Miura derives from five historic lines of Spanish bull: the Gallardo, Cabrera, Navarra, Veragua, and Vistahermosa-Parladé.

The bulls were fought under the name of Juan Miura until his death in 1854. Then they were under the name of his widow, Josefa Fernandez de Miura. After her death, the livestock bore the name of her eldest son Antonio Miura Fernandez from 1869 to 1893 and then the younger brother, Eduardo Miura Fernandez until his death in 1917.

Reputation
Bulls from the Miura lineage have a reputation for being large, fierce, and cunning. It is said to be especially dangerous for a matador to turn his back on a Miura. Miura bulls have been referred to as individualists, each bull seemingly possessing a strong personal character.

In Death in the Afternoon, Ernest Hemingway wrote:

Famous bulls

Murciélago survived 24 jabs with the lance from the picador in a fight on 5 October, 1879, against Rafael "El Lagartijo" Molina Sanchez, at the Coso de los califas bullring in Córdoba, Spain.
Islero gored and killed bullfighter Manolete on August 28, 1947.

References

Bibliography

See also 

 List of breeds of cattle

Cattle breeds
Bullfighting
Cattle breeds originating in Spain